Neptunium(IV) nitrate is an inorganic compound, a salt of neptunium and nitric acid with the chemical formula Np(NO3)4. The compound forms gray crystals, dissolves in water, and forms crystal hydrates.

Synthesis
Addition of dilute nitric acid to freshly prepared neptunium(IV) hydroxide:

Physical properties
Neptunium(IV) nitrate forms gray hygroscopic crystals.

It is soluble in water.

It forms a crystal hydrate of the composition Np(NO3)4•2H2O.

References

Neptunium compounds
Nitrates